Peñón Blanco ("white stone" in Spanish) may refer to:
 Peñón Blanco, Durango, a municipality in Durango state of Mexico
 Salinas de Peñón Blanco, also known as Salinas de Hidalgo, a town in San Luis Potosí state, Mexico
 Penon Blanco Peak, near Coulterville, California, US